KRYPHSA Football Club is an Indian women's football club based in Imphal, Manipur, that competed in the Indian Women's League.

History
In 1964, residents of Naoremthong, a locality on the outskirts of Imphal, decided that they needed a club to give exposure for local football talents. Kangchup Road Young Physical and Sports Association was born and along with it, the hopes and dreams of Naoremthong. KRYPHSA is crowd–funded community club. Funds collected from the 3,500 households in the Naoremthong area are used as base for club income, while tambola games, which are held twice a year and are very popular in the Imphal area, also contribute a sizeable amount to the club.

Indian Women's League
KRYPHSA participated in the preliminary round of inaugural season of Indian Women's League. The club finished third in group stage, behind fellow Imphal Eastern Sporting Union and Jeppiaar Institute, failing to qualify to next round. Though club got invitation from AIFF to participate in the final round later, it decided not to participate due to financial problems.

In 2017–18 season, KRYPHSA finished the preliminary round second, behind Eastern Sporting Union and played in the final round. KRYPHSA entered semifinal finishing top of the group. In semifinal, KRYPHSA lost to Rising Student Club in a penalty shootout.

Team records

Seasons

 PR: Preliminary round.

Current squad

Technical staff

Honours
 Indian Women's League
 Runners-up (1): 2019–20
 Manipur Women's League
 Champions (2): 2016, 2019

References

External links
 Team profile at All India Football Federation

Kryphsa F.C.
Football clubs in Manipur
Association football clubs established in 1964
1964 establishments in Manipur
Women's football clubs in India